Plestiodon leucostictus, the Chinese blue-tailed skink, is a species of lizard which is found in Taiwan.

References

leucostictus
Reptiles described in 1988
Taxa named by Tsutomu Hikida